Ifon Osun is a large town  in Osun State, Nigeria. It is the headquarters of the Orolu Local Government Area. It consists of many great chiefs and compounds. They include Eesa, Afin, Laaropo, Eleesi, Sobaloju, Aaje, Alasape, Ooye, Asade, Ile Basorun, Ile Oba, etc. too numerous to mention. It is a great Kingdom of the descendants of Obatala, has about 74 villages surrounding the town.
The town has an official Post Office and a Local Government Library. Predominantly fertile and grassy forest suitable for farming and agro-forestry. It has a stream named Owala on its boundary with Ilie township. It has many attributes for tourist attraction.
Home to a notable prince, Adesola Adegboyega Akande and others such as Durotomi Amuda, Bashiru Akanfe Tijani, Professor Ademola Oladejo, Dr. Oyewo, Rufus Woleola Ojo, Chief James Layioye Ojo, Wale Ojo (Awake) and Alhaji Rasheed Oyedele.

References

Populated places in Osun State